Mais Abdel-Jabbar Hamdan Selim (born October 31, 1982), better known as Mais Hamdan, is a Jordanian actress, singer and TV presenter. Her sisters are Mai Selim and Dana Hamdan.

Early life
Mais Hamdan was born in Abu Dhabi, United Arab Emirates to a Jordanian father of Palestinian descent, and a Jordanian-Lebanese mother. She graduated from the Faculty of Commerce – English Section, Cairo University.

Career
Hamdan started her career through the comedian TV show CBM which was aired on MBC, she was also the presenter of the TV show Meyya Mesa and Sister Soup with her sisters Mai and Dana.

In 2004, Hamdan started her TV career in Khareta Am Rakan and Sawalef Hareem, and Qerqee'aan in the next year. 2006 witnessed her film debut, she played the role of "Jameela" in the Egyptian film Zarf Taree (Emergency Case) alongside Ahmed Helmy and Nour, and the Saudi film Keif al-Hal?

In April 2020, her TV commercial for Cottonil was banned due to her mentioning of "underwear".

Filmography

Films

TV

References

External links 

Living people
Jordanian actresses
Jordanian television actresses
Jordanian film actresses
Jordanian women singers
1982 births
Jordanian people of Lebanese descent
Jordanian people of Palestinian descent
Cairo University alumni